Jamaica competed at the 2004 Summer Olympics in Athens, Greece, from 13 to 29 August 2004. This was the nation's fourteenth appearance at the Summer Olympics as an independent nation, although it had previously appeared in the first four editions as a British colony, and as part of the West Indies Federation. The Jamaica Olympic Association sent a total of 47 athletes to the Games, 22 men and 25 women, to compete only in track and field (the largest ever by sport), badminton, shooting, and swimming. For the second consecutive time in Olympic history, Jamaica was represented again by more female than male athletes.

With Merlene Ottey's sudden demise to compete for Slovenia at these Games, the Jamaican team featured several Olympic medalists from Sydney, including track hurdler Danny McFarlane and sprinter Sandie Richards, who followed Ottey's path as another Jamaican athlete to compete in five Olympic Games since her debut in 1988. Being the oldest and the most sophisticated athlete of the team, Richards was appointed by the committee to become the nation's flag bearer in the opening ceremony. Other notable Jamaican athletes also featured the Atkinson swimming clan Janelle, Jevon, and Alia, and top medal favorite Asafa Powell in the men's 100 metres.

Jamaica left Athens with a sterling record of five medals (two golds, one silver, and two bronze), being marked as an enormous improvement from Sydney, where the nation failed to claim a single gold. After picking up the first Olympic medal of her illustrious career, sprinter Veronica Campbell sought her sights to break a historic milestone as she became the first Jamaican athlete in history to claim an individual Olympic title in the women's 200 metres. She was also named the most decorated Jamaican athlete of the Games, after helping out her relay team produce a brilliant finish with their second gold and collecting the bronze earlier in the 100 metres. Meanwhile, Danny McFarlane added a second silver to his Olympic career hardware in the men's 400 metres hurdles, finishing behind Dominican Republic's Félix Sánchez by only a few hurdles left in the track.

Medalists

Athletics

Jamaican athletes have so far achieved qualifying standards in the following athletics events (up to a maximum of 3 athletes in each event at the 'A' Standard, and 1 at the 'B' Standard).

Men
Track & road events

Field events

Combined events – Decathlon

Women
Track & road events

* Competed only in heats and received medals

Field events

Badminton

Shooting 

Jamaica has qualified a single shooter.

Women

Swimming 

Jamaican swimmers earned qualifying standards in the following events (up to a maximum of 2 swimmers in each event at the A-standard time, and 1 at the B-standard time):

Men

Women

See also
 Jamaica at the 2003 Pan American Games
 Jamaica at the 2004 Summer Paralympics

References

External links
Official Report of the XXVIII Olympiad
Jamaica Olympic Association

Nations at the 2004 Summer Olympics
2004
Summer Olympics